The Chassepot (pronounced  SHAS-poh), officially known as Fusil modèle 1866, was a bolt-action military breechloading rifle. It is famous for having been the arm of the French forces in the Franco-Prussian War of 1870–1871. It replaced an assortment of Minié muzzleloading rifles, many of which were converted in 1864 to breech loading (the Tabatière rifles). An improvement to existing military rifles in 1866, the Chassepot marked the commencement of the era of modern bolt action, breech-loading military rifles. The Gras rifle was an adaption of the Chassepot designed  to fire metallic cartridges introduced in 1874.

It was manufactured by Manufacture d'armes de Saint-Étienne (MAS), Manufacture d'Armes de Châtellerault (MAC), Manufacture d'Armes de Tulle (MAT) and, until 1870, in the Manufacture d'Armes de Mutzig in the former Château des Rohan. Many were also manufactured under contract in England (the "Potts et Hunts" Chassepots delivered to the French Navy), in Belgium (Liege), and in Italy at Brescia (by Glisenti). The approximate number of Chassepot rifles available to the French Army in July 1870 was 1,037,555 units. Additionally, state manufacturies could deliver 30,000 new rifles monthly. Gun manufacturers in England and Austria also produced Chassepot rifles to support the French war effort. The Steyr armory in Austria delivered 12,000 Chassepot carbines and 100,000 parts to France in 1871. Manufacturing of the Chassepot rifle ended in February 1875, four years after the end of the Franco-Prussian War, with approximately 700,000 more Chassepot rifles made between September 1871 and July 1874.

History 
The Chassepot was named after its inventor, Antoine Alphonse Chassepot (1833–1905), who, from the mid-1850s onwards, had constructed various experimental forms of breech loaders. The first two models of the Chassepot still used percussion cap ignition. The third model, using a similar system to the Prussian Dreyse needle gun, became the French service weapon on 30 August 1866. In the following year it made its first appearance at the Battle of Mentana on 3 November 1867, where it inflicted severe losses upon Giuseppe Garibaldi's troops. It was reported at the French Parliament that "Les Chassepots ont fait merveille!", ("The Chassepots have done wonderfully!") The heavy cylindrical lead bullets fired at high velocity by the Chassepot rifle inflicted wounds that were even worse than those of the Minié rifle. By 1868, the entire French active army had been re-armed with the Chassepot.

In the Franco-Prussian War (1870–1871), the Chassepot met its Prussian counterpart, the Dreyse needle-fire rifle. The Chassepot had several advantages over the Dreyse. It featured a rubber obturator on its bolt head to provide a more efficient gas-seal. Although it fired a smaller caliber (11 mm vs. 15.4 for the Dreyse), the Chassepot ammunition had more gunpowder (5.68 grams vs 4.85 grams), resulting in higher muzzle velocity (436 meters per second, 33% over the Dreyse), a flatter trajectory and a longer range. Thus the sights on the Chassepot could be elevated up to 1,600 meters, while the maximum sight setting of the Dreyse was only 600 meters. The Chassepot had a weight of 4.1 kg versus 4.57 kg for the needle-fire rifle. It was also shorter (1310 mm vs. 1424 mm).

After the war, 20,000 captured Chassepot rifles were sold to the Shah of the Persian Qajar dynasty. 

In 1872 the Empire of Brazil purchased 8631 Chassepots; after being faced with a possible war involving Argentine claims over Paraguay. The weapons, however, were never officially distributed to the Army, since the decision to buy the Comblain had already been made and because of issue with the cartridge's reliability. The weapons ended their career in deposit or were handed over to police forces and shooting clubs. Some of these weapons were possibly used by rebels during the War of Canudos, they may have been captured from the Bahia police after the engagement at Maceté  

Surplus Chassepot were exported to China. Some of the warriors of the Ethiopian Empire were equipped with Chassepot rifles during the first Italo-Ethiopian War of 1896.

Technology

Bolt mechanism

The breech was closed by a bolt similar to those of more modern rifles. Amongst the technical features of interest introduced in 1866 on the Chassepot rifle was the method of obturation of the bolt by a segmented rubber ring which expanded under gas pressure and thus sealed the breech when the shot was fired. This simple yet effective technology was successfully adapted to artillery in 1877 by Colonel de Bange, who invented grease-impregnated asbestos pads to seal the breech of his new cannons (the De Bange system).

Cartridge
The Chassepot used a paper cartridge that many refer to as 'combustible', although in reality it was quite the opposite. It held an  round-headed cylindro-conoidal lead bullet that was wax paper patched. An inverted standard percussion cap was at the rear of the paper cartridge and hidden inside. It was fired by the Chassepot's needle (a sharply pointed firing pin) upon pressing the trigger. While the Chassepot's ballistic performance and firing rates were excellent for the time, burnt paper residues as well as black powder fouling accumulated in the chamber and bolt mechanism after continuous firing. The bolt's rubber obturator eroded in action but was easily replaced in the field by infantrymen. The older Dreyse needle gun and its cartridge had been designed to minimize those problems but to the detriment of its ballistic properties.

To correct this problem the Chassepot was replaced in 1874 by the Gras rifle which used a centerfire drawn brass metallic cartridge. Otherwise, the Gras rifle was basically identical in outward appearance to the Chassepot rifle. Nearly all rifles of the older Chassepot model (Mle 1866) remaining in store were eventually converted to take the 11 mm Gras metallic cartridge ammunition (fusil Modèle 1866/74). About 665,327 Chassepot rifles had been captured by the German coalition that defeated France in 1871. Large numbers of these captured Chassepot rifles were shortened and converted to 11 mm Mauser metallic cartridge. It served with cavalry units of the Kingdom of Saxony and of the Kingdom of Bavaria. Others were disposed of "as is" with British surplus dealers. In most but not all, the French receiver markings on these German-captured Chassepot rifles had been erased.

Gallery

See also
 Antique gun
 Service rifle

Notes

References
 Ford, Roger. The World's Great Rifles London: Brown Books, 1998. .

Further reading

External links

 The French Army 1600–1900
 Forgotten Weapons – Chassepot Needle Rifle

Rifles of France
Early rifles
Franco-Prussian War
Second French intervention in Mexico
French Foreign Legion
Single-shot bolt-action rifles